The 240s decade ran from January 1, 240, to December 31, 249.

Significant people

References